Phillip Schobesberger (born 10 December 1993) is an Austrian professional association football player who plays as a right winger for SKU Amstetten.

Club career

Early career
Schobesberger won the 2012–13 Austrian Cup with Pasching.

Rapid Wien
Schobesberger transferred to Rapid Wien in the summer transfer window in 2014. His contract was originally scheduled to go to 2018. However, on 28 August 2015, he signed a one-year extension.

International career
Schobesberger got his first call up to the senior Austria squad for a UEFA Euro 2016 qualifier against Russia in June 2015.

Career statistics

Club

Honours

Club
Austrian Cup: 2012–13

References

External links
 
 

1993 births
Living people
Austrian footballers
Austria international footballers
Association football midfielders
FC Juniors OÖ players
SK Rapid Wien players
SKU Amstetten players
Austrian Football Bundesliga players
2. Liga (Austria) players